Miscellanea Malacologica is a peer-reviewed scientific journal covering malacology, specifically  papers on the taxonomy, nomenclature, and zoogeography of mollusks. The journal is published by Marien Faber (Duivendrecht, the Netherlands) and was established in 2004.

The name of the journal is Latin for "malacological miscellany". The journal is a large format publication with color illustrations. It is published on an irregular basis: from 2004 to 2012 it had from two to five issues per year. The journal is abstracted and indexed in The Zoological Record.

References

External links 
 
 List of type specimens of taxa described in the journal

Malacology journals
Publications established in 2004
English-language journals